Saei is an Arabic surname. Notable people with the surname include:

Hadi Saei (born 1976), Iranian councilor and taekwondo competitor
Zahra Saei (born 1980), Iranian politician, researcher, and academic

Arabic-language surnames